Bagisara repanda, the wavy lined mallow moth, is a moth of the family Noctuidae. The species was first described by Johan Christian Fabricius in 1793. It is found from the southern United States (South Carolina to Florida, west to Texas), south through Guatemala, Panama, the Antilles, Paraguay, Colombia, Venezuela, Guyana and Brazil to Argentina.

The length of the forewings is 10–12 mm. In Louisiana, most adults are on wing from late August to November. Adults are on wing all year round in the tropics and perhaps in Florida.

The larvae feed on Sida species and possibly other plants in the Malvaceae.

External links

Bagisarinae
Moths described in 1793